Little Prince is a 2008 South Korean drama film. Directed by first-time director Choi Jong-hyun, it is loosely inspired by French writer Antoine de Saint-Exupéry's most famous novella The Little Prince.

Synopsis

Cast
 Tak Jae-hoon as Han Jong-cheol
 Kang Soo-han as Yeong-woong  
 Jo An as Seon-ok 
 Park Won-sang as Yong Joon-soo 
 Shin Dong-mi as Eun Hee-soo 
 Lee Ho-jae as Han Jeong-tae 
 Lee Yong-yi as Superintendent Catholic sister 
 Jeon Moo-song as Han Jong-cheol's father-in-law
 Jung Yun-seok as Han Eun-kyu

References

External links
 
 
 

2008 films
South Korean drama films
2000s Korean-language films
Works based on The Little Prince
2000s South Korean films